George Lawrence may refer to:

George Alfred Lawrence (1827–1876), British novelist and barrister
George Lawrence (painter) (1901–1981), Australian painter
George Lawrence (politician) (1857–1924), Manitoba MLA and cabinet minister
George Lawrence (footballer) (born 1962), former professional footballer with Southampton F.C. and A.F.C. Bournemouth
George Lawrence Davis (1830–1894), missionary
George Hill Mathewson Lawrence (1910–1978) American botanist, author and Professor of Botany.
George Newbold Lawrence (1806–1895), American ornithologist
George R. Lawrence (1868–1938), American photographer and aviation designer
George P. Lawrence (1859–1917), U.S. Representative from Massachusetts, 1897–1913
Sir George St Patrick Lawrence (1804–1884), English soldier, born in Ceylon
George Van Eman Lawrence (1818–1904), U.S. Representative from Pennsylvania
George Lawrence Price (1892–1918), the last soldier killed in WWI